The Columbus Babies/River Snipes were a minor league baseball team from Columbus, Georgia, that played in the Class B Southern League in 1896. The team finished the season with a 35–60 (.368) record.

References 

Southern League (1885–1899) teams
Baseball teams established in 1896
Baseball teams disestablished in 1896
Sports in Columbus, Georgia
Professional baseball teams in Georgia (U.S. state)
1896 establishments in Georgia (U.S. state)
1896 disestablishments in Georgia (U.S. state)
Defunct baseball teams in Georgia